Women in the California Gold Rush, which began in  Northern California in 1848, initially included Spanish descendants, or Californios, who already lived in California,  Native American women, and rapidly arriving immigrant women from all over the world.    At first,  the numbers of immigrant women were scarce, but they contributed to their community nonetheless. Some of the first people in the mining fields were wives and families who were already in California. A few settler women and children and the few men who did not leave their family worked right alongside the men but most men who arrived left their wives and families home. The number of women in California changed very quickly as the rich gold strikes and lack of women created strong pressures in the new Gold Rush communities to restore sex balance. As travel arrangements improved and were made easier and more predictable the number of women coming to California rapidly increased. Most women probably came by way of Panama as this was one of the fastest trips (40–90 days) and one of the most reliable—although expensive in 1850--$400–$600/person one-way. Passage via Panama became much more predictable after the paddle wheel steam ship lines were up and running by late 1849. In Ireland, the Great Famine was a period of mass starvation, disease and emigration between 1845 and 1852 that drove many desperate women to the United States and on to California.

Women of many different continents, statuses, classes, and races were involved in the California Gold Rush. The fast-increasing population had very few women in it and what women there were found myriads of opportunities. As word of the gold rush spread so did the word of opportunities for women to work in the women's poor goldfields and communities.

Women going to California to rejoin their families usually had their passages paid for by miners or businessmen who had decided to make California their new home. Most of the men had originally planned to get their gold, return to their homes and families, and enjoy their new riches. Typically women euphemistically labeled as entertainers had little or no money for passage but as soon as they showed up in California they were hired by various saloons, gambling halls, dance halls, peep shows and/or brothels. The cost of passage was typically paid for by the entertainer agreeing to work for the payees for at least three to six months. These entertainers initially were the majority of the female population. Very few of these entertainers made the five- to six-month trip by wagon on the California Trail or chose the five- to seven-month all sea journey around Cape Horn.

As the gold mining and associated businesses prospered, many men decided to make California their new home and many husbands or potential husbands sent money back to their original homes for their women and families to join them. Others went back east to wind up their business there and escort their women and families to California. Many single men started communicating with female acquaintances they knew and many proposals were accepted with this long-distance dating. In some cases, it would take 60 days for a letter to go from California via Panama to a city in the east and another 40–60 days for a reply, so this was ’slow’ courting.  If these long-distance proposals were accepted, the prospective groom, i.e. a successful miner or businessman, sent money for passage. Usually, as soon as the prospective bride got off the ship they were rushed to a preacher to get married. Most single women in California quickly had several proposals for marriage.  As time went on, the ever-increasing immigration of more women and families started changing the composition of the female population and the entertainers soon became outnumbered.

There were many opportunities for women in the cities and goldfields as men, starved for female company, paid extravagant fees to associate with women or buy products that were made by women. There are several stories of women making more money selling homemade pies, doughnuts, etc. than their husbands made mining. Laundries, restaurants, lodging, mending, waiting tables, all paid good wages; some women made their fortunes as entrepreneurs.

The entertainers were joined by few other women (less than 3% of initial travelers) who came either overland via the California Trail or by sea with their husbands and families. They refused to be left behind to fend for themselves or miss an exciting life changing opportunity. A few of these travelers became widows as their husbands died of disease or were killed. On the California Trail, about 4% of the people on the trail died from accidents, cholera, fever, and myriad other causes, and many women became widows before even setting eyes on California.  On the sea voyage via Panama there were the usual hazards of traveling across the Isthmus of Panama by canoe and mule, waiting in disease prevalent Chagres and Panama City, where cholera and yellow fever often took a dreadful toll—up to 30% of some groups of travelers.  The final step was catching a paddle wheel steam ship for the 15- to 20-day trip to California. See Ulysses S. Grant's biography for a vivid description of the hazards of crossing Panama.

The sex imbalance in California (indeed in most of the West) would persist though several generations as the number of females gradually increased to something roughly equivalent to the numbers of males.

Number of women

The 1850 U.S. California Census, the first census that included all non-Indian people,  showed only about 7,019 females with 4,165 non-Indian females older than 15 in the state. To this should be added about 1,300 women older than 15 from San Francisco, Santa Clara, and Contra Costa counties whose censuses were lost and not included in the totals. This gives about 5,500 females older than 15 in a total California non-Indian population  of about 120,000 residents in 1850 or about 4.5% female. The number of women in the mining communities and mining camps can be estimated by subtracting the roughly 2,000 females who lived in predominately Californio (Hispanics born in California before 1848) communities and were not part of the gold rush community. About 3.0% of the gold rush Argonauts before 1850 were female or about 3,500 female Gold Rushers compared of about 115,000 male California Gold Rushers.

By California's 1852 State Census the population has already increased to about 200,000 of which about 10% or 20,000 are female. Competition by 1852 had decreased the steam ship fare via Panama to about $200 and the Panama Railroad (completed 1855) was already working its way across the Isthmus making it ever easier to get to California.

By the 1860 U.S. Federal Census California had a population of 330,000 with 223,000 males and 107,000 females—still a male to female ratio greater than 2 males to 1 female. By 1870 the population had increased to 560,000 with 349,000 males and 211,000 females or a ratio of 100 males to 38 females. Equilibrium female-male number parity would take till the 1950 census with a total population of 10,586,000; 5,296,000 males compared to 5,291,000 females.

Early arrivals
Women of all different statuses, classes, and races were involved in the California Gold Rush.  The rapidly increasing California population had very few women and women found a myriad of different opportunities which were normally not available to them. As word of the gold rush spread so did the word of opportunities for women to work in the women poor gold fields and communities. Some of the first women to show up were women from southern California, Sonora, Chihuahua, Acapulco, and San Blas. Since Sonoran women predominated they all were typically all labeled 'Sonorans' or 'Senoritas' by the miners. They were soon joined by women from Panama, Ecuador, Peru and Chile. Since Chileans predominated all the South America Latinos were all typically called 'Chilenos'.  As word got back to the east coast of the job opportunities for women and travel arrangements were worked out with paddle wheel steam ship lines with dependable schedules on the Caribbean and Pacific Ocean, many more women started coming to California.

Living conditions
In San Francisco, an official port of entry for California shipping and passengers, the population exploded from about 200 in 1846 to 36,000 in 1852. In San Francisco initially many women (and men) were housed in wooden houses, ships hauled up on the shore to serve as homes or businesses, canvas wood framed tents and other flammable structures. These types of structures combined with a lot of drunken gamblers and miners led almost inevitably to many fires. Most of San Francisco burned down six times in six "Great Fires" between 1849 and 1852. From San Francisco by late 1849 paddle steamers were transporting the miners and others  to Sacramento and the start of the California Gold Rush country.

Women in sex work and entertainment

Women flooded to California from several countries and cities to work as sex workers and entertainers to capitalize on the scarcity of women. Most had worked as sex workers or entertainers in some other city before going to California. They worked in saloons, gambling halls, dance halls, peep shows or brothels, and some set up their own businesses. Many came to marry a prosperous miner or businessman and leave the business. Many of them did. Others became mistresses to high rolling customers who could afford to keep them in the style they desired. In the early 1850s women were so scarce that sex workers were not typically viewed by most as immoral, and many were in fact highly desired and their company actively sought. Initially there were virtually no laws prohibiting or trying to regulate or control sex work, and a handful of madams became so prosperous and powerful they helped keep local police, doctors, theater managers, politicians and liquor salesmen in business. The often flamboyant fashion styles set by many sex workers were copied by other women.

Most of the women who worked in the saloons, gambling halls, dance halls and/or brothels were labeled ’’entertainers’’. Typically these entertainers had little or no money for passage but as soon as they showed up they were hired by various saloons, gambling halls, dance halls and/or brothels who paid for the cost of their trip. The women typically repaid the cost of passage by agreeing to work for the payees at least three to six months. In women-starved California men paid up to $16.00 to $20.00 a night for the privilege of having them sit at the same gaming table with them.

Young Chinese girls were bought in China and sold as Chinese sex workers for Chinese men and were considered to be the bottom of the sex worker hierarchy. They were always far fewer than the male Chinese population with only seven Chinese sex workers known in 1850. Hispanic women typically were considered one rung up in desirability. In late 1849 French sex workers got a head start as about 200 of them showed up in San Francisco. Other French sex workers showed up from French settlements in Lima Peru and Santiago Chile. White American and French sex workers were considered the most desirable and charged the highest prices. Many French sex workers, for example, became very wealthy since they were actively sought at the saloons, gaming tables, dance halls, peep shows, etc. and as escorts to prosperous miners and business men. Typically, the lighter complexion a woman had, the higher price she could ask. Sex work occurred in organized brothels, individually rented rooms, and in saloons, gaming halls, or fandangos—which offered dancing, gambling, alcohol, and sometimes sex workers. Increasing populations of miners' and businessmens' wives and their families helped further stigmatize sex work when middle-class morality began to come to California in the late 1850s.

In 1850, San Francisco had 537 registered saloons. There was little opportunity to do anything except visit the saloons—very little else existed. California sex workers suffered from a litany of problems common to sex workers then and now. Unwanted pregnancy was a distinct possibility since there were no commonly available contraceptive drugs or devices.  The choices with an unwanted pregnancy were back-room abortion or giving birth and raising an illegitimate child of often-uncertain parentage. Disease was a constant problem, since syphilis was common among a lot of men and women. If discovered in time, there were treatments for syphilis but it was costly and painful. Other diseases, like cholera, measles, tuberculosis, diphtheria, were constant threats as knowledge of how they were spread or how to treat them was unknown. Germs would remain unknown for another 30 years and evasive to effective treatment for over a century in many cases. City Sanitation practices were expensive and not understood as clean water and sewage collection and treatment were just starting to develop. Epidemics like cholera and yellow fever killed thousands. Medical treatments were of very uneven quality as almost anyone could call themselves a doctor and treat patients—professional medical training and certification was just starting to be developed. Medical knowledge was so poor that training often did little or no good.

To make more money, the women were often paid to 'push' drinks on their customers and if successful they often ended up inebriated. Sometimes they were allowed to drink tea which only looked like the expensive drinks their companions were paying for. Drug, alcohol or gambling addiction was a common problem as some women tried to escape into another world.  Often sex workers were managed by pimps who collected a large share of their earnings. Drunk customers were a continuous problem. Many men were dirty and wore dirty clothes. Bathing involved a strenuous process of heating water on a wood stove, dumping it in a tub, washing down and then dumping the dirty water. Not everyone believed in being clean, and baths were infrequent for many. Eventually bath houses developed where bathing could be done for a fee. Clothes were hard to wash and iron and there are several stories of dirty laundry being sent to Hawaii to be cleaned and ironed and then returned— it was cheaper than doing it locally.

Some of California's sex workers were indentured Chinese women, economically and socially oppressed Latina women, or kidnapped and enslaved White women. From 1848 to the late 1850s, sex workers experienced an unprecedented decline in power and a rapid fall from grace as more ‘’respectable’’ women and their families came to California. Many sex workers were illiterate and signed contracts with dubious legality with an X. As the number of sex workers multiplied, their rates went down and it became harder to make a living. As sex work became illegal, it was often necessary to bribe the local police to continue to operate.

Some women, like Ah Toy and Belle Cora gained power and wealth in the early San Francisco Gold Rush days by becoming successful madams and operating brothels. Toy, allegedly the first Chinese sex worker in San Francisco, opened a string of brothels and used the San Francisco court system to protect herself and her businesses. Cora, a clergyman's daughter, operated a brothel in San Francisco that "offered the handsomest and most skillful girls, at the highest prices, of any bagnio in the city."

Other forms of women's work
A few women came to California with their husbands and children and often helped pan for gold or earn cash while the husband tried his luck panning for gold. Others came directly on their own to mine for gold. One Mexican woman was said to have brought several workers to the mines to pan gold for her; another made over $2,000 in forty-six days of mining. One of the most popular ways for a woman to earn a living was to run a boarding house; the memoirist Mary Ballou was one example. Another was cooking or running a restaurant. California was about the only place that women could earn wages higher than men for equivalent work because women  were scarce, and the men would pay just to be in their company and have them do household tasks the men did not want or know how to do. One enterprising woman earned $18,000 baking pies.

Washing clothes was another occupation women engaged in. Originally, most of the washerwomen were Native or Mexican women. When White men saw how lucrative the profession could be, they also joined in. A pond in San Francisco called "Washerwoman's Bay" became a popular spot for women doing laundry to congregate, and a meeting was held by laundry workers in 1850 to discuss fees being charged and organize into a society. By 1853, however, Chinese male immigrants had supplanted women in the laundry business.

Some women and girls, like Lola Montez and Lotta Crabtree, found success in dancing and acting. Montez arrived in San Francisco after a career in Europe. Lotta Crabtree, the daughter of Gold Rush immigrants, began her career dancing for miners at the age of six.

Most single women came as part of a family group or as entertainers. Many men did not find their fortunes in the gold fields, and having a woman around to earn money with boarding, washing, cooking, sewing, etc. could mean the difference between the family living well and not. A few women  had their own gold mining claims and came out west with the specific intention of panning for gold. As the easy to find placer gold became scarcer and mining became more complex, women typically moved out of the gold fields and into some other type of work. Most women had many marriage proposals and could get married almost as soon as they found someone they liked.

For some women, the Gold Rush opened up economic and career opportunities they did not have back home. Julia Shannon and Julia Randolph became well-known professional studio photographers, a new field that was relatively easy for women to enter, though it was still dominated by men. Eleanor Dumont, or Madame Moustache, as she was sometimes known, earned her living as a card shark, moving from town to town, and eventually opened up her own gambling parlor. Entrepreneur Mary Ellen Pleasant, who called herself a "capitalist", used the vast wealth she accumulated to free slaves through the Underground Railroad. Other women worked as barbers, nurses, schoolteachers, mule packers, and circus performers. Charlotte Parkhurst dressed as a man and drove a stagecoach. One woman managed a theater; another ran a bowling alley. One woman writes of seeing a "lady bullfighter."

In the mines in the Sierra Nevadas, where there were fewer White women, Mexican and Chilean women gained importance as increased competition caused them to leave the larger towns and cities and go to the smaller gold mining camps.  This opportunity for upward economic gain was easier for non-White women than for non-White men.

Writers and journalists
Some women wrote letters home, diaries, or newspaper articles describing their experiences during the Gold Rush, which were collected and published by later historians to offer insight into their journeys West and life at that time. One of the more notable works is The Shirley Letters, by Louise Amelia Knapp Smith Clappe. Other writers include Luzena Wilson, Mary Jane Megquier,  Sallie Hester, and Eliza Farnham. Jennie Carter wrote for the African-American California newspaper The Elevator during the 1860s and 1870s.

Marriage
The scarcity of women in Gold Rush California skewed the marriage market in their favor. While parental approval and economic concerns still occasionally played a role in engagements, they decreased in importance. Mixed marriages, while still stigmatized, were more common in California due to the diverse pool of women in which White women were a small minority. Women also found it easier to get a divorce in California than elsewhere, as the judges seemed to want to increase the number of women in the marriageable "pool". As divorcées, these women did not receive the negative public scrutiny sometimes evident elsewhere, because divorce was often part of the new Californian culture. Eligible women usually had several proposals for marriage in a short time.

Starting in the mid-1850s, people began to settle into their traditional roles, mores and economic classes and abandoned non-traditional gender roles. Many lone men sent for their families and middle-class American morality re-emerged as the number of middle-class wives and families increased. It is estimated that about 30% of the male miners were married men who had left their families to try their luck in California. Many men returned to their homes but many others transferred their families to California and stayed. The influx of more White women, who were seen as symbols of purity and morality in the typical Victorian view, often changed the accepted morality and mores. In some communities with large populations of non-White immigrants, some non-White male groups were assigned formerly "feminine" roles (e.g., the Chinese laundry and cooks).

Property rights
Delegates at the 1849 California Constitutional Convention considered and adopted California's first constitution.  It provided that "All property, both real and personal, of the wife, owned or claimed by her before marriage, and that acquired afterwards by gift, devise, or descent, would remain her separate property". Delegates advanced various arguments in favor of the provision, including that it reflected the existing law of California as well as that of other states. The language of the proposal was taken nearly word for word from the Texas constitution, reflecting the civil law tradition there and in other states historically under the sway of French- or Spanish-based legal systems. The English-based common law under which many American jurisdictions operated then, women upon marriage had little or no property rights beyond provisions for one-third of the household goods and land in the event of death of the husband.

There were arguments both for and against this provision. A delegate recently arrived from New York warned against granting women separate property rights, based on his experiences in France. There, he argued, such rights promote "the spectacle of domestic disunion.... There the husband and wife are partners in business, raising the wife from head clerk to partner. The very principle is contrary to nature and contrary to the married state." One delegate who supported the provision declared, "We are told, Mr. Chairman, that woman is a frail being; that she is formed by nature to obey, and ought to be protected by her husband, who is her natural protector. That is true, sir; but is there any thing in all this to impair her right of property which she possessed previous to entering into the marriage contract?  I contend not." Another argued that it would empower women and attract them to the state, where marriageable Anglo-American women were scarce: "Having some hopes that I may be wedded...I shall advocate this section in the Constitution, and I will call upon all the bachelors in this convention to vote for it. I do not think that we can offer a greater inducement for women of fortune to come to California. It is the very best provision to get us wives that we can introduce into the Constitution."

While interpretations of the constitutional provision varied, according to scholar Donna C. Schuele, "A consensus emerged whereby the constitutional guarantee of married women's property rights was viewed as a progressive enactment boldly distinguishing the Golden State from eastern jurisdictions struggling to emerge from the grips of antiquated notions of law and patriarchy." In 1850, however, the California State Legislature enacted property laws that expressly undermined certain aspects of the constitutional guarantee. In particular, one statute provided that the husband had management and control even of the wife's separate property, although he could not sell or encumber the property without the wife's consent made in writing and confirmed outside the presence of the husband. California also adopted community property laws when it became a state, giving each spouse a right to half of whatever was acquired during the marriage.

Native American women

In the early days of the Gold Rush, the indigenous people of California, including women, also panned for gold, some quite successfully.  Though gold had no exchange value in their cultures, they recognized its value for the new arrivals.  The men would dig and pass the mud to the children, who then carried it in baskets to the women. The women, lined up along the stream, washed the mud in grass baskets, extracting the gold.   However, as more and more immigrants from all over the world arrived, conflicts between the newcomers and Native peoples escalated, Indian extermination, relocation and enslavement became official California policy  and women were sometimes the targets of rape or massacre and  kidnapped to be sold into slavery, along with their children.  In one incident, an aged chief surrounded himself with women as he was under attack by White men, telling the women they were safe because he did not believe the Whites would kill women. The chief and the women all lost their lives. The newcomers also brought disease and starvation as environmental resources were depleted.  In 1850,  California  passed a law that allowed Whites to enslave Natives who were found orphaned or 'loitering'.  Enslavement of Native people had already been established by the Spaniards and Californios who preceded the Gold Rush. After the Gold Rush, bounties were offered for "Indian hunters" who could prove they had killed a Native by bringing in a body part. The Indian population of California fell from 150,000 in 1848 when gold was discovered to 30,000 in 1870. Some Natives were able to  escape extermination  by passing as Mexicans.   Stories of massacres, forced relocation, and kidnappings have been passed down through the generations, often by women,  and are still remembered by California Native people today.

References

,,,,,,

Further reading
 
 
 .
 .
 .
 
 
 .
 Dame Shirley, Marlene Smith-Baranzini, The Shirley Letters from the California Mines, 1851-1852, Heyday, 1854

External links
 The Shirley Letters at California Legacy Book Series
 Joanne Levy,  Women of Gold, California Highway 49

.
California Gold Rush
History of women in California
19th-century American women